René Bol (born 5 July 1956) is a Canadian water polo player. He competed in the men's tournament at the 1984 Summer Olympics.

References

External links
 

1956 births
Living people
Canadian male water polo players
Olympic water polo players of Canada
Water polo players at the 1984 Summer Olympics
Sportspeople from Wellington City